Titan is a fictional location appearing in American comic books published by Marvel Comics. It is depicted in the Marvel Universe as the home of the Titanian Eternals on Saturn's moon Titan. It first appeared in Iron Man #55 (Feb 1973) and was conceived by Jim Starlin and Mike Friedrich. The Titanians, also known as Titans, were later retconned as being an offshoot of the Eternals, which had been created separately by Jack Kirby.

Titan appeared in the 2018 film Avengers: Infinity War and 2019 film Avengers: Endgame as a ruined planet and the former home of Thanos.

Fictional history
The colony of Titanian Eternals was founded about 750,000 years ago in the aftermath of a devastating civil war among the first generation of Earth's Eternals. The Eternals Uranos and Kronos led opposing factions, which clashed in a conflict of ideals over the Eternals' destiny as a people. Kronos' side prevailed, and Uranos and his surviving followers were exiled into space and landed on the planet Uranus. There, they discovered a supply depot guarded by Kree Sentry #213. When the Eternals destroyed the Sentry and raided the outpost, the Kree armada came to investigate, thinking Earth's solar system to be devoid of intelligent life. The armada destroyed the Eternals’ spacecraft, forcing them to crash on the moon Titan, where they hid from the Kree. There, the small group of survivors formed a colony beneath the surface of the moon, employing artificial life systems. These Eternals eventually fell prey to internal strife, and all of them but Sui-San were killed. Mentor, who had gone into voluntary exile, arrived on Titan, and the two Eternals began to repopulate the Titan colony.

These new Titanian Eternals achieved much scientifically and socially, not the least of which was ISAAC, an immense computer system that could monitor and maintain all of the life support functions of the inner world.

Under A'lars' leadership, Titan became a haven for peace. Then, A'lars (also known as Mentor) sired the last two of his numerous children: Eros and Thanos. Thanos was born a mutant, and grew up with dark visions of conquest and destruction. Thanos left Titan, recruited an army of mercenaries, and returned to attack. Only a hundred of Titan's thousands of inhabitants survived, and Sui-San perished in the slaughter. Eventually, the Titanians rebuilt the colony and restored it to a place of meditation and the pursuit of knowledge.

Named inhabitants of Titan
 Chaos - Cloned being created by ISAAC, while acting under Thanos’ control.
 The Cotati - Refugees from Hala under the protection of the Priests of Pama. 
 Demeityr - Young Titan companion of Sundragon. 
 Dionysus - Cloned being created by ISAAC, while acting under Thanos’ control.
 Dr. Aurilius - Titan Medic. 
 Dragon of the Moon - Elderspawn child of Chthon
 Elysius - Cloned being created by ISAAC, while acting under Thanos’ control. She betrayed ISAAC and allied with Mar-Vell. 
 Emlot - 
 Genis-Vell - Cloned child of Mar-Vell and Elysius. Brother of Phyla-Vell who was killed by Baron Zemo.
 ISAAC (Integral Synaptic Anti+/Anionic Computer) - Moon-wide computer that controls all systems. It was once corrupted by Thanos to create agents of war to continue his war. 
 Kazantra- One of Mentor's wives.
 Lord Gaea - Cloned being created by ISAAC, while acting under Thanos’ control. 
 Mentor -
 Monks of Shao Lom - The mentors of Moondragon. 
 Moondragon (Heather Douglas) - Adopted by Mentor and raised on Titan
 Phyla-Vell - Cloned child of Mar-Vell and Elysius. Sister of Genis-Vell. Known as Captain Marvel, Quasar, and Martyr, the avatar of Oblivion. She's also the step-sister of Dorrek VIII (Hulkling). 
 Priests of Pama - Pacifistic Kree who protect the Cotati
 Shastra - 
 Starfox (Eros) - Hedonistic Avenger who is Thanos’ brother. 
 Stellarax - Cloned nihilistic terrorist created by ISAAC, while acting under Thanos’ control. 
 Sui-San - Mother of Starfox and Thanos. She was the last living follower of Uranos on Titan until she was vivisected by her son Thanos. 
 Sundragon - Cousin of Moondragon and companion of Demeityr. 
 Thanos - The Mad Titan
 Thyrio - 
 Tycho - 
 Uranos -

Mar-Vell's (Captain Marvel) grave and Genis-Vell's memorial monument are on the surface of the moon.

In other media

Television
 In the Avengers Assemble episode "Thanos Rising," Falcon finds footage of Titan being firebombed while searching through Uatu the Watcher's computer.
 Titan appears in the Guardians of the Galaxy episode "Titan Up." This is where Thanos trains his followers at and is where Sam Alexander's father Jesse is being held prisoner.

Film
 In Avengers: Infinity War, Titan is a habitable exoplanet. It is revealed to be the home-planet of Thanos and was left in ruin due to overpopulation which Thanos tried to prevent by offering a solution to his people which was exterminating half the population. In 2018, Tony Stark, Stephen Strange, Peter Parker, and Guardians of the Galaxy members Peter Quill, Drax, and Mantis meet each other on Titan in order to confront Thanos. Strange uses the Time Stone to look into millions of possible outcomes from their conflict, but only one in which they win. They battle Thanos when he arrives and are joined by Nebula. Later, as Stark is about to be killed by Thanos, Strange surrenders the Time Stone in exchange for Stark’s life. After the Blip, Stark and Nebula are the only survivors on Titan. 
 In Avengers: Endgame, a restored Strange brings the restored Parker and Guardians from Titan to Earth via a portal.
 In Doctor Strange in the Multiverse of Madness, it is revealed that in the Earth-838 dimension, the Illuminati kill Thanos on Titan, and then kill that universe's version of Stephen Strange after he is corrupted by the Darkhold.

References

External links 
 

Eternals (comics)
Fiction set on Titan (moon)
Marvel Comics locations